Sonic Jihad is the debut studio album by American industrial rock band Snake River Conspiracy, released in the United States on July 11, 2000, by Reprise Records, and in the UK on November 13, 2000, through Morpheus Records, an imprint label of Reprise.

Besides six original songs, Sonic Jihad contains five covers; "You and Your Friend" by T-Ride, "Lovesong" by The Cure, "How Soon is Now?" by The Smiths, and "Act Your Age" and "Oh Well" by Running with Scissors.

Sonic Jihad garnered mostly positive reviews from critics, who praised the album's aggressive and inventive production and Tobey Torres' vocal performances, although some perceived the album as uneven and stylistically unoriginal. Three singles were released from the album: "Vulcan", "How Soon is Now?" and "Breed". "How Soon is Now?" and "Breed" charted in the US.

Commercial performance 
Although the album itself was relatively unsuccessful, three singles were released, two of which charted. The first single, "Vulcan", failed to reach any chart. The next single, however, "How Soon Is Now", performed well in the United States, where it reached No. 38 on the Alternative chart and #15 on the Dance Club Songs chart; the song also entered the UK Singles Chart, at number 83. The third single, "Breed", reached No. 37 on the Dance Club Songs chart.

Critical reception 

Sonic Jihad received generally positive reviews from music critics.

Eden Miller of PopMatters spoke positively of the album, stating that, "Anger has never been so much fun or so approachable," and praising the group's "strong personality". Drowned in Sounds review, written by Kate Price, was similarly positive, awarding the album 9 out of 10 and stating that the album, "Is a journey, lyrically and musically, through human emotions and represents... the triumph of passion over technology."

Sonic Jihad was widely praised in the British rock and heavy metal press. Roberto Cannelloni of Metal Hammer praised the album's inventiveness and Tobey Torres' vocal performances, which he labelled "works of genius full of twisted keyboards and buzzsaw guitars layered underneath probably the finest voice in rock today" and awarded the album a perfect score. Dave Everly of Kerrang! hailed the album as "A vitriolic blast of venomous post-techno noise rock". Johnathan Long of Rock Sound stated that while Snake River Conspiracy's initiative of using 1980s music as inspiration was not exactly original, citing the bands Orgy and VAST as other contemporary examples, the band retained a "visceral edge to their music" and called the album a "surprisingly delightful debut".

Other reviewers were less favourable. AllMusics William Ruhlmann likened Snake River Conspiracy to the rock group Garbage and Nine Inch Nails, but felt that, "Their sound may be too hard for pop fans and too soft for rock fans," which lead him to giving the album 3 out of 5 stars. NME writer Darren Johns was critical of the album's gothic undertones and "Dark Mood Syndrome", which he felt undermined the album's "shiny, happy chorus hooks", but also praised the songs "Somebody Hates You" and "How Soon Is Now?", which he called "the oddest, and therefore best, moments" on the album.

Accolades

Track listing
Notes
 signifies an uncredited songwriter/contributor

Sample credits

 "Breed" contains a sample from "New Identity", written by Jerry Goldsmith, and featured in the score for the 1968 film Planet of the Apes.
 "Strangled" contains a sample from "Goldfinger", written by John Barry, Leslie Bricusse, Anthony Newley (credited only to Barry in liner notes), and performed by Shirley Bassey.

Personnel 
Personnel per liner notes, although credits are disputed.Snake River Conspiracy
 Jason Slater – bass, guitar, instruments, production, songwriting (all tracks),  mixing (1-7, 9, 11)
 Tobey Torres – vocals, lyrical contributions (uncredited)
Additional personnel
 Geoff Tyson – additional production (uncredited), remixes
 Michael Urbano – drums (uncredited)
 Greg Camp – guitar solo on "Strangled" (uncredited)
Artwork
 Michael Kahne – art direction, design, illustrations
 Stephen Lee – photography
 Melaine Nissen – photography
Production
 Eric Valentine – production, engineering, songwriting (1-4, 6–7, 9–10), mixing (4, 10)
 David Kahne – production, mixing, engineering, overdubs, orchestral arrangements, songwriting (1-3, 5–7, 9, 11)
 Charlie Clouser – production, mixing (8)
 Rob Brill – engineering (uncredited)
Krish Sharma – mixing (1, 2, 7, 9)
 Doug Trantow – mixing (5)
 Brian Gardener – mastering (at Bernie Grundman Mastering)
Management
 Eric Gotland – management (at EGM Management)
 Dusty Sorenson – management (at EGM Management)
 David Kahne – A&R

Use in media 
"Breed" is used in the 2001 film Valentine during the end credits. The "Prince Quick Mix's Cracker Beat Pass Mix" of "How Soon Is Now" was included on the American Eagle Outfitters compilation Summer 9ine. “Lovesong” features in an episode of HBO's The Sopranos.

Charts

Release history

Notes

References

2000 debut albums
Albums produced by David Kahne
Albums produced by Jason Slater
Albums produced by Eric Valentine
Albums produced by Charlie Clouser
Snake River Conspiracy albums